Mengujüma is a Angami Naga village located in the Kohima District of Nagaland.

Demographics 
Mengujüma is situated in the Kohima District of Nagaland. As per the Population Census 2011, there are a total 116 households in Mengujüma. The total population of Mengujüma is 537.

See also 
Kohima District

References 

Villages in Kohima district